The 1989 Individual Speedway World Championship was the 44th edition of the official World Championship to determine the world champion rider. It was the second time the championship was held in West Germany after previously being held in Norden in 1983.

The World Final was held at the Olympic Stadium in Munich. Hans Nielsen made up for his 1988 run-off defeat to fellow Dane Erik Gundersen by scoring a 15-point maximum to take his third World Championship. Nielsen joined fellow Danes Ole Olsen and Erik Gundersen as a three time Speedway World Champion.

Simon Wigg from England finished second with the slick,  track suiting his long track style. Wigg defeated fellow Englishman Jeremy Doncaster in a run-off for second and third places. In what would prove to be his last World Final before his career ending crash in the World Team Cup Final at the Odsal Stadium in England just two weeks later, Erik Gundersen finished in fourth place. His chances of an outright second-place finish (after having finished second behind Nielsen in Heat 4) ended when his bike's engine seized while leading heat 9 causing him to not finish the race. In a sad twist, it was also seized engine in Heat 1 of the World Team Cup Final that would cause Gundersen's career ending crash.

Australian rider Troy Butler had a lucky passage to the World Final. After finishing fourth in the Australian Championship, he replaced countryman Jamie Fagg in the Commonwealth Final, finishing eighth to qualify for the Overseas Final. He then finished tenth in the Overseas Final to be the first reserve for the Intercontinental Final. He then got a start in the Intercontinental Final at Bradford when Overseas champion Sam Ermolenko injured his back in a horrific Long track motorcycle racing crash and was forced to withdraw (the American would be out for over 6 months). Butler would finish twelfth in the IC Final to become a reserve for the World Final where he once again came in as an injury replacement when Dane Jan O. Pedersen was forced to pull out. The 1986 Australian Champion ultimately finished twelfth in Munich, finishing with 4 points (two second places) from his 5 rides.

Overseas Series

New Zealand Qualification
First 3 from New Zealand final to Commonwealth final

Australian Qualification
First 3 from Australian final to Commonwealth final

Swedish Qualification

Swedish Final
 May 16, 17 & 18
  Nässjö, Nyköping & Karlstad
 First 5 to Nordic Final plus 1 reserve

Danish Final
May 19
 Vojens, Speedway Center
First 6 to Nordic final plus 1 reserve

British Final
May 21
 Coventry, Brandon Stadium

First 10 to Commonwealth final plus 1 reserve
{| width=100%
|width=50% valign=top|

American Final
June 3
 Long Beach, Veterans Memorial Stadium
First 4 to Overseas final plus 1 reserve

Commonwealth Final
June 4
 Manchester, Belle Vue Stadium
First 12 to Overseas final plus 1 reserve

*Mitch Shirra and Darren Wilson replaced Larry Ross and Mark Thorpe. Troy Butler replaced Jamie Fagg.

Nordic Final
June 4
 Tampere, Ratinan stadion
First 7 to Intercontinental final plus 1 reserve

Overseas Final
June 25
 Coventry, Brandon Stadium
First 9 to Intercontinental final plus 1 reserve

* Rick Miller replaced Shawn Moran. Bobby Schwartz came in as the reserve rider

Continental Final
August 12
 Debrecen, Debrecen Speedway
First 5 to World final plus 1 reserve

Intercontinental Final
August 13
 Bradford, Odsal Stadium
First 11 to Intercontinental final plus 1 reserve

*Troy Butler replaced the injured Sam Ermolenko. Martin Dugard came in as the reserve rider.

World final
September 2, 1989
 Munich, Olympic Stadium
Referee: Henry van den Boomen

* Troy Butler replaced the injured Jan O. Pedersen. Andy Grahame came in as the reserve rider.

Classification

References

1989
Individual
Individual
Speedway competitions in Germany